The Mitchell Grass Downs (MGD) is an IBRA biogeographic region, located in the Northern Territory and Queensland,  which comprises an area of  with eight subregions. 

See Interim Biogeographic Regionalisation for Australia

See also

Geography of Australia

References

Further reading
 Thackway, R and I D Cresswell (1995) An interim biogeographic regionalisation for Australia : a framework for setting priorities in the National Reserves System Cooperative Program Version 4.0 Canberra : Australian Nature Conservation Agency, Reserve Systems Unit, 1995. 

Biogeography of the Northern Territory
Biogeography of Queensland
IBRA regions